Jan-Christoph Oetjen (born 21 February 1978 in Rotenburg an der Wümme) is a German politician of the Free Democratic Party.

Early life and education
Oetjen studied economics at the University of Hannover.

Political career

Career in state politics
Oetjen joined the FDP in 1995. He first became a member of the State Parliament of Lower Saxony in the 2003 state elections, and was subsequently re-elected three times. From 2003 until 2011, he served as his parliamentary group's spokesperson on agriculture policy.

Member of the European Parliament, 2019–present
In October 2018, Oetjen was elected candidate for the 2019 European elections by his party. He is also a member of the European Parliament Intergroup on Anti-Racism and Diversity and the European Parliament Intergroup on Seas, Rivers, Islands and Coastal Areas.

Oetjen is active in the following committees and delegations of the European Parliament in various functions:

Vice-Chairman:

TRAN - Committee on transport and tourism

Member:

DACP - Delegation to the ACP-EU Joint Parliamentary Assembly

Substitute:

DEVE - Committee on Development

LIBE - Committee on Civil Liberties, Justice and Home Affairs

DROI - Subcommittee on Human Rights

DMAS - Delegation for relations with the Mashreq countries

Personal life
Oetjen is married to a French woman. The couple has two daughters.

Other activities
 Sparkasse Rotenburg-Osterholz, Member of the Supervisory Board

References

Free Democratic Party (Germany) politicians
Members of the Landtag of Lower Saxony
1978 births
Living people
MEPs for Germany 2019–2024